Krasnodar Krai is a federal subject of Russia (a krai), located in the North Caucasus region in Southern Russia and administratively a part of the Southern Federal District. Its administrative center is the city of Krasnodar. The third most populous federal subject, the krai had a population of 5,838,273 as of the 2021 Census.

Krasnodar Krai is formally and informally referred to as Kuban, a term denoting the historical region of Kuban situated between the Sea of Azov and the Kuban River which is mostly composed of the krai's territory. It is bordered by Rostov Oblast to the north, Stavropol Krai to the east, Karachay-Cherkessia to the south-east, and Adygea is an enclave entirely within the krai. Krasnodar Krai shares an international border with the disputed region of Georgia, Abkhazia, to the south, and borders annexed Crimea to the west, across the Kerch Strait.

The northern part of the krai belongs to the Don Steppe, while the southern region's Mediterranean climate has made it a popular tourist location. Novorossiysk is Russia's main port on the Black Sea, one of the few cities awarded the title of the Hero City,
and Sochi was the host of the XXII Olympic Winter Games in 2014. Krasnodar Krai is home to significant infrastructure of the Russian Navy's Black Sea Fleet.

Geography

Krasnodar Krai is located in the southwestern part of the North Caucasus and borders with Rostov Oblast in the northeast, Stavropol Krai and Karachay-Cherkessia in the east, and with the Abkhazia region (internationally recognized as part of Georgia) in the south. The Republic of Adygea is completely encircled by the krai territory. The krai's Taman Peninsula is situated between the Sea of Azov in the north and the Black Sea in the south. In the west, the Kerch Strait separates the krai from the contested Crimean Peninsula, internationally recognised as part of Ukraine but under de facto Russian control.

The krai is split into two distinct parts by the Kuban River, which gave its name to this entire geographic region. The southern, seaward part is the western extremity of the Caucasus range, lying within the Crimean Submediterranean forest complex ecoregion; the climate is Mediterranean or, in the southeast, subtropical. Historically it is known as Circassia. The northern part is a steppe zone which shares continental climate patterns. It is also known as Kuban region.

The Black Sea coast stretches from the Kerch Strait to Adler and is shielded by the Caucasus Mountains from the cold northern winds. Numerous small mountain rivers flow in the coastal areas, often creating picturesque waterfalls.

Lake Abrau, located in the wine-making region of Abrau-Dyurso, is the largest lake in the northeastern Caucasus region.

History
The region's earliest known inhabitants are referred to, generally, as the Maiōtai, who are the ancestors of the modern-day Circassians, Abkhazians and Abazins (after the Greek name for the Sea of Azov). During the 6th century BC, Pontic Greeks founded the area's first cities, such as Phanagoria (near modern Sennoy) and Hermonassa (on the Taman Peninsula),  who traded with nomadic tribes including the Skuthai (Scythians) and Sindi.

From the 8th to the 10th centuries, the area was dominated by the Khazars, a Turkic people who had earlier migrated from the east onto the Pontic-Caspian Steppe, where a hypothesis claims that they converted to Judaism.  After the defeat of the Khazar Khanate in 965 Kievan Prince Svyatoslav conquered the area, it came under the rule of Kievan Rus', and it then formed the Tmutarakan principality. Later, due to the increasing claims of the Eastern Roman Empire at the end of the 11th century, the Tmutarakan principality came under the authority of the Eastern Roman Emperors (until 1204).

In that period of history, the Circassians were first mentioned, under the ethnonym Kassogs. For example, the Kassog Prince Rededya was mentioned in The Tale of Igor's Campaign.

In 1243–1438, the current territory of the Kuban was part of the Golden Horde. After the latter's collapse, parts of Kuban were held under the Crimean Khanate, Circassia, and the Ottoman Empire, which dominated the region. The Tsardom of Russia began to challenge the protectorate of the Ottoman Empire in the area during the Russo-Turkish wars.

In April 1783, after the liquidation of the Crimean Khanate, right-bank Kuban and Taman Peninsula were annexed to the Russian Empire by decree of Catherine II. In 1792–1794, the Cossacks moved there from Zaporizhzhia, now located in Ukraine, and formed the Black Sea Area troops, with the creation of a solid cordon line for the Kuban River and the marginalization of the neighboring Circassians. The administrative region was accorded the status of "Land of Black Sea Cossack Army", with its center in the city of Yekaterinodar (renamed Krasnodar by the Bolsheviks in 1920).

In 1900, the region's population numbered around two million people. In 1913, the gross grain harvest Kuban region entered second place in Russia, for the production of marketable grain – in first place. During the Russian Civil War, the anti-communist Kuban People's Republic was established on 28 January 1918. It sought union with the Ukrainian People's Republic during its brief independence until Soviet forces occupied the latter in May 1920.

Krasnodar Krai was founded on 13 September 1937, when Azov-Black Sea Krai of the Russian SFSR was split up in Krasnodar Krai and Rostov Oblast. On 30 January 1996 Krasnodar Krai signed a power-sharing agreement with the federal government, granting it autonomy. This agreement would be abolished on 12 April 2002.

2012 floods

On July 7, 2012, at least 171 people died in Krasnodar Krai, after torrential rains overnight caused the worst flooding and landslides in more than seventy years. Over  of rain – the typical amount for a four- or five-month period – was reported to have fallen within forty-eight hours. Ten more deaths occurred in Gelendzhik, including five electrocuted when a transformer fell into the floodwater, and two in Novorossiysk. Authorities stated that 17 people had been officially reported missing, and there were fears the death toll would rise further, while medics had hospitalized 210 people, including 16 children.

The regional government claimed that over 24,000 people were affected by the floods, with more than 3,000 evacuated, and that more than 10,000 rescuers and 140 helicopters were searching for victims and evacuating survivors. In Krymsk, 14 temporary shelters were set up to house around 2,000 evacuees. The transport system in the region was said to have collapsed, while oil shipments from Novorossiysk were halted when the port, located in the lower part of the city, was threatened by landslides. Russia's President Vladimir Putin flew to the area to hold emergency talks with officials in Krymsk, while authorities in Perm Krai dispatched a rescue team to evacuate dozens of children from the region, who had been staying at summer camps on the Black Sea coast.

Residents of Krymsk claimed the wave of water that hit the town resulted from the sluice gates of a nearby reservoir being opened, although the prosecutor general's investigative committee denied this. Local prosecutors had earlier confirmed that the gates were opened, but stated that it was too early to determine whether this was the cause of the flooding.

Politics

During the Soviet period, the high authority in the krai was shared between three persons: the first secretary of the Krasnodar CPSU Committee (who in reality had the greatest authority), the chairman of the Krai Soviet (legislative power), and the chairman of the Krai Executive Committee (executive power). In 1991, the CPSU lost power, and the head of the krai administration, and eventually the governor have been since appointed/elected alongside elected regional parliament.

The Charter of Krasnodar Krai is the fundamental law of the region. The Legislative Assembly of Krasnodar Krai is the province's standing legislative (representative) body. The assembly exercises its authority by passing laws, resolutions, and other legal acts and by supervising the implementation and observance of the laws and other legal acts passed by it. The highest executive body is the krai government, which includes territorial executive bodies such as district administrations, committees, and commissions that facilitate development and run the day-to-day matters of the province. The krai administration supports the governor's activities, who is the highest official and acts as the guarantor of the observance of the Krai Charter in accordance with the Constitution of Russia.

Administrative divisions

Krasnodar Krai is administratively divided into thirty-eight districts (raions) and fifteen cities of district equivalence. The districts and cities are further subdivided into eleven towns, plus urban-type settlements, and rural okrugs and stanitsa okrugs.

Economy

As a result of 2014 Winter Olympics, Krasnodar Krai has seen significant infrastructure spending. Over $50 billion has been spent on various infrastructure projects including a bullet train. 

Large companies in the region include Tander, Novorossmetal, Autonomous Heat Energy Company, Gazprom gas distribution Krasnodar, and Evrokhim Chemical Fertilizers.

Transportation
Several lines of Russian Railways cross the region and link it with Abkhazia, Ukraine, and neighboring Russian regions. There are direct trains from resort cities like Sochi and Anapa to Moscow, via Krasnodar, which become very popular during the summer vacation season. There are also suburb train connections.
The Apsheronsk narrow-gauge railway, the longest mountain narrow-gauge railway in Russia, runs through Krasnodar Krai.

There are several airports in the region, including Krasnodar International Airport, Sochi International Airport, Anapa Airport, and Gelendzhik Airport.

The biggest ports are Novorossiysk and Tuapse. Others are Eisk and Temryuk on the Azov Sea, and Port Kavkaz,   Taman, Anapa, Gelendzhik, and Sochi on the Black Sea. The Crimean Bridge connects Krasnodar Krai and Crimea.

Demographics

Population 
5,404,300 (2014 est.);

Life expectancy

Settlements

The population of Krasnodar Krai is concentrated in the Kuban River drainage basin, which was traditionally Cossack land (see History of Cossacks). The Kuban Cossacks are now generally considered to be ethnic Russians, even though they are still an important minority in their own right in the area. Historically, they were considered to be ethnic Ukrainian, and reported their language as Ukrainian in censuses well into the 20th century (see National Identity of Kuban Cossacks). This change in identity is due to assimilation and historical persecution of the Kuban Cossacks, which was particularly prominent due to questions of their loyalty to Moscow and the Communist state during the Russian Revolution and First World War.

Other notable ethnic groups include the Adyghe, who are the regions indigenous population and were nearly completely annihilated following the Circassian genocide, and the Armenians (including Christian Hamsheni and Cherkesogai), who have lived in the region since at least the 18th century.

Ethnic groups 
The 2021 Census identified ethnic groups, as shown in the following table:

Religion

According to a 2012 survey 52.2% of the population of Krasnodar Krai adheres to the Russian Orthodox Church, 3% are unaffiliated generic Christians, 1% are either Orthodox Christian believers who don't belong to church or members of non-Russian Orthodox churches, and 1% are Muslims. In addition, 22% of the population declares to be "spiritual but not religious", 13% is atheist, and 7.8% follows other religions or did not give an answer to the question.

References

Notes

Sources

External links

 Official website of Krasnodar Krai  

 
Historical regions
Southern Federal District
Kuban
Krais of Russia
North Caucasus
Russian-speaking countries and territories